The 2003 UNLV Rebels football team represented the University of Nevada, Las Vegas during the 2003 NCAA Division I-A football season. UNLV competed as a member of the Mountain West Conference (MW) and played their home games at Sam Boyd Stadium in Whitney, Nevada

Schedule

References

UNLV
UNLV Rebels football seasons
UNLV Rebels football